USCGC Glen Harris (WPC-1144) will be the United States Coast Guard's 44th  cutter.

Design

Like her sister ships, Glen Harris is designed to perform search and rescue missions, port security, and the interception of smugglers.  She is armed with a remotely-controlled, gyro-stabilized 25 mm autocannon, four crew-served M2 Browning machine guns, and light arms. She is equipped with a stern launching ramp, that allows her to launch or retrieve a water-jet propelled high-speed auxiliary boat, without first coming to a stop.  Her high-speed boat has the over-the-horizon capability, is useful for inspecting other vessels, and deploying boarding parties.

The crew's drinking water needs are met through a desalination unit.  The crew mess is equipped with a television with satellite reception.

Operational career

While as a pre-commissioning unit Glen Harris was deployed to assist the Seacor Power, a 234-foot liftboat. She arrived on the scene within 30-minutes and was able to rescue one of the six people to survive the incident. Reportedly, 19 people were aboard. Glen Harris was formally commissioned at Fort Macon in North Carolina near her namesake's birthplace on August 6, 2021.

Glen Harris and her sister ship Emlen Tunnell left Key West, Florida on November 18, 2021, escorted by the medium-endurance cutter . After conducting at-sea refueling training off Puerto Rico on December 11, 2021, the three ships arrived in Mindelo, Cabo Verde on December 29, 2021. On January 5, 2022, the three Coast Guard vessels and a Royal Moroccan Navy frigate rescued 103 migrants and recovered two bodies from two rafts that were taking on water forty miles west of the Moroccan coast.

Namesake

In 2010, Master Chief Petty Officer of the Coast Guard Charles "Skip" W. Bowen, who was then the United States Coast Guard's most senior non-commissioned officer, proposed that all 58 cutters in the Sentinel-class should be named after enlisted sailors in the Coast Guard, or one of its precursor services, who were recognized for their heroism.  The Coast Guard chose Glen Harris as the namesake of the 36th cutter.  Harris, and three other Coast Guard sailors, piloted the first landing craft during the United States' first amphibious landing, in the Pacific Theater, in World War II.  Harris and his three colleagues were each awarded a Silver Star medal for this task.  His colleagues Daniel Tarr and Harold Miller have Sentinel-class cutters named after them, as will his other colleague William Sparling.

References

Sentinel-class cutters
Ships of the United States Coast Guard
Ships built in Lockport, Louisiana
2021 ships